John Lundgren may refer to:

 John Lundgren (cyclist) (born 1940), Danish cyclist
 John Lundgren (baritone) (born 1968), Swedish baritone opera singer
 John F. Lundgren, CEO and chairman of Stanley Black & Decker, 2004–2016